There is a little Shia community in El Salvador. There is an Islamic Library operated by the Shia community, named Fatimah Az-Zahra. They published the first Islamic magazine in Central America: Revista Biblioteca Islámica. Additionally, they are credited with providing the first and only Islamic library dedicated to spreading Islamic culture in the country.

See also
Shia Islam in Canada

References

Islam in El Salvador
El Salvador
El Salvador